The North Louisiana Football Alliance (NLFA) is an nine-man football american football developmental league based in Bossier City, Louisiana. The league established itself as a single entity, owning all eight of its teams, and playing during spring from March to May. The league began to play in July 2020 in wake of the COVID-19 pandemic, competing in an abbreviated season.

Background

Each year countless high school athletes miss out on an opportunity to play football at the collegiate level due to a variety of circumstances. Air Force veteran Holland Witherspoon took notice, developing an interest in this occurrence, and decided to create somewhat of a platform to serve as a college alternative for these athletes to further player development as well as assist them in advancing to a more established professional league.

History

The NLFA was established in 2019, introducing nine-man to the southern region. It was created as an alternative for young athletes who weren't offered an opportunity to play at the collegiate level a chance to pursue a potential career playing pro-style football, with an opportunity to advance to a professional level.

All teams will play their games at one scheduled location within the Ark-La-Tex region during the regular season. The league is the first to attempt to brand nine-man adult tackle football as a professional minor league.

2020 season
In July 2020, originally slated for a March 21 start date, the league was forced to push its inaugural season back due to the COVID-19 pandemic. However, the league found itself playing an abbreviated schedule as social distancing mandates began to loosen, thus serving as a demo season.

2021 season-present
For the 2021 season, the league was finally in a position to compete in its first full season, competing in an eight-week regular season from two hub cities: the West Division in Bossier City, Louisiana, and the East Division in Minden, Louisiana. The league saw its first championship game, hosting the LA Tigers and the Bossier City Bombers, where the Tigers emerged as the league champions. On July 28, 2021, the Tigers announced their departure from the NLFA to return to eight-man contention.

On October 8, 2021, the North Louisiana Football Alliance announced that the league had signed a multi-year agreement with Stinger Sports to become the official on-field apparel and uniform provider for all of its teams.

On November 14, 2021, the NLFA hosted an international combine for the Fútbol Americano de México (FAM), a professional American football league based in Mexico. The tryouts were held at Independence Stadium (Shreveport) in Shreveport, Louisiana, and were arranged in conjunction with former Alabama running back Trent Richardson’s brand TR3 Combines.

On March 19, 2022, the league started the season with only 4 of its 8 teams, and are scheduled to play a 10-week schedule, playoffs included, and will include one bye-week.

On January 26, 2023, the league announced that Longview, Texas would become the third hub city location for the 2023 season and beyond.

Season Structure

The NLFA season will feature a 6 to 10-game, 8 to 10-week regular season running from March to May and a 4-team single-elimination playoff beginning at the end of May or in June, culminating in the NLFA Championship Game the same month.
Because the NLFA season is played during the spring season, which is different from the high school, college, and NFL seasons, the NLFA will primarily schedule Saturday and Sunday games.

Exhibition season
Following winter training camps, NLFA teams typically play one or two exhibition games from late February through early March. Each team is free to schedule these games, but all games are approved by the league commissioner. No games are allowed within two weeks of the team's first regular-season game. The games are useful for new players who are not used to playing nine-man football.

NLFA Elite game
The league will begin hosting its version of an All-Star game once it completes the inaugural 2021 season. The game will feature its top players from the East and West divisions.

NLFA Rules

The NLFA has rules that are different and specific to the league, with the most noted being no Kickoffs or PAT conversions. In addition to nine-man tackle, rule differences are:
 30-second play clock
 Running clock until the last two minutes of each half
 Only 5-man rush allowed
 Ball placed at the 20-yard-line to begin possession at the start of each half, and after touchdowns and field goals
 Receivers only need one foot in bounds to complete a catch
 All punts are declared a free-kick, and the punter must be at least 10 yards behind the center. NO fake punts. However, if the punter muffs the snap or the ball goes over his head, it then becomes live, and the defense is allowed to make a play on the ball.
 After a safety, the scoring team will receive possession at their own 30-yard line.

Media

On April 6, 2022, FoxD Network and the North Louisiana Football Alliance announced that Belly Up Media will televise all NLFA games on Roku and TikiLive for the 2022 season. In addition, NLFA teams will also have highlights of their games available on the leagues' YouTube channel after each broadcast. Each NLFA team is free to work out its own radio network deal with local stations, and the stations employ its announcers.

Players and Compensation

The league would focus its recruitment efforts on high school graduates not going to college or having been removed from school within three years to play in the NLFA. 
The NLFA does not have a base salary for its players but has established a bonus and incentive system instead. In addition, NLFA players will be allowed to enter into sponsorship agreements with local businesses.

Teams

Western Division

Bossier City Hub
 Bombers – Bossier City, Louisiana
 Roughnecks – Bossier City, Louisiana 

Longview Hub
 Eagles – Longview, Texas
 Wranglers – Longview, Texas

Eastern Division

Minden Hub
 Cyclones – Minden, Louisiana
 Lumberjacks – Homer, Louisiana
 Lions – El Dorado, Arkansas
 Rattlers – Ruston, Louisiana

NLFA Champions

NLFA Commissioners
Jeremy Gallman (2019–2022)

References

American football leagues in the United States
Sports leagues established in 2019
2019 establishments in the United States